The Seafarer 26 is an American sailboat that was designed by McCurdy & Rhodes a cruiser and first built in 1977.

Production
The design was built by Seafarer Yachts in the United States, starting in 1977, but it is now out of production.

Design
The Seafarer 26 is a recreational keelboat, built predominantly of solid laminate fiberglass, with wood trim. It has a masthead sloop rig, a raked stem, a slightly reverse transom, a skeg-mounted rudder controlled by a wheel and a fixed fin keel or optional shoal draft keel. It displaces  and carries  of ballast.

The boat is normally fitted with a small outboard motor or optionally with an inboard Japanese Yanmar 1GM diesel engine for docking and maneuvering.

The design has sleeping accommodation for four people, with a double "V"-berth in the bow cabin and two straight settee berths in the main cabin around a drop-leaf table. The galley is located on both sides of the companionway ladder, with a two-burner stove to starboard and an ice box and sink to port. The head is located just aft of the bow cabin.

See also
List of sailing boat types

References

External links

Photo of a Seafarer 26
Photo of a Seafarer 26

Keelboats
1970s sailboat type designs
Sailing yachts 
Sailboat type designs by McCurdy & Rhodes
Sailboat types built by Seafarer Yachts